Events in the year 2013 in Gabon.

Incumbents 

 President: Ali Bongo Ondimba
 Prime Minister: Raymond Ndong Sima

Events 

 3 November – A total solar eclipse was visible in the country.

Deaths

References 

 
2010s in Gabon
Years of the 21st century in Gabon
Gabon